John Cox of the North Staffs Hospital Centre, Stoke-on-Trent, was president of the Royal College of Psychiatrists from 1999 to 2002.

References

British psychiatrists
Fellows of the Royal College of Psychiatrists
Living people
Year of birth missing (living people)
Place of birth missing (living people)